McGahon is an Irish surname. Notable people with the surname include:

 Brendan McGahon (1917–2017), Irish politician
 John McGahon (born 1990), Irish politician

See also
 McGowan
 McMahon

Surnames of Irish origin
Anglicised Irish-language surnames